The Scapegoat is a 1912 American short silent Western film directed by Otis B. Thayer and starring Tom Mix.

Plot summary

Cast
 Tom Mix as Tom Mason, the Scapegoat
 Myrtle Stedman as Nellie Wright, Tom's sweetheart
 William Duncan as Jack Wright, Nellie's brother
 Olive Mix as Mrs Mason, Tom's mother 
 Frank Carroll as Mr Mason, Tom's father
 Florence Dye as Alice Mason, Tom's sister
 C. Parry as Harry Mason, Tom's brother
 Olive Strokes as Rose Wright, Nellie's sister
 Kenneth D. Langley as Jim Woods, Rose's sweetheart

Plot
After being wrongly accused of theft and ordered out of the family home by his irate father, Tom Mason goes west and settles in Colorado. He falls in love with Nellie and is later elected town sheriff. Nellie's brother Jack is a cowboy who gets involved with the wrong people and takes part in a bank robbery. Tom and Nellie are out of town and Nellie's horse bolts. Tom stops the horse and saves her life. On returning to town, Tom learns of the robbery and forms a posse. The outlaws split and Jack tries to swim across a river to evade his pursuers. He gets into difficulty and Tom ropes him to pull him out of the water. Nellie is astounded that her brother is a bank robber and pleads with Tom to release him. Tom reluctantly agrees but hands in his badge with the stolen money and rides away.

References

External links
 

1912 films
1912 Western (genre) films
American silent short films
American black-and-white films
Films directed by Otis B. Thayer
Silent American Western (genre) films
1910s English-language films
1910s American films